The 1967–68 Indiana Hoosiers men's basketball team represented Indiana University. Their head coach was Lou Watson, who was in his 3rd year. The team played its home games in New Fieldhouse in Bloomington, Indiana, and was a member of the Big Ten Conference.

The Hoosiers finished the regular season with an overall record of 10–14 and a conference record of 4–10, finishing 9th in the Big Ten Conference. Indiana was not invited to play in any postseason tournament.

Roster

Schedule/Results

|-
!colspan=8| Regular Season
|-

References

Indiana Hoosiers
Indiana Hoosiers men's basketball seasons
Indiana Hoosiers
Indiana Hoosiers